Hyperthaema pulchra is a moth of the subfamily Arctiinae. It was described by Rothschild in 1935. It is found in Colombia.

References

Phaegopterina
Moths described in 1935